Danny Ahn (Hangul: 데니안; born December 22, 1978) is a Korean-American entertainer best known as the main rapper of the South Korean pop music group g.o.d. He is notable for his unique rapping. Having made his debut in the entertainment industry as a member of g.o.d in 1999, Ahn has gone into acting and has also been a radio DJ and MC.

Early life
Ahn was born in Seattle, Washington and holds American citizenship, although he later moved to South Korea with his family and spent most of his schooling years there. He and g.o.d bandmate Joon Park are first cousins; Ahn's father is the youngest sibling of Joon's mother. When he was in elementary school his parents divorced and he and his older sister went to live with their mother. As a teenager, he began aspiring to become a singer after listening to Seo Taiji and Boys. He studied Theater and Film at Dankook University.

Career

Beginnings
Ahn's professional career began with his debut in the K-pop industry as a rapper for singer Uhm Jung-hwa. He was also part of a mixed-gender project group along with his friend Son Ho-young, Shoo and Kim Hwan-sung but it fell through; Kim was later recruited as the final member of NRG and Shoo joined S.M. Entertainment where she would debut as part of girl group S.E.S.

In 1997 Ahn was recruited by his cousin Joon for a project group he was forming. Between 1997 and 1998, Son, Yoon Kye-sang and Kim Sun-a were recruited through auditions while Park Jin-young joined the group as their producer and mentor. However, Kim Sun-a left to pursue acting and was replaced with Kim Tae-woo, then still a high school student. The group eventually became a five-man boy band and named g.o.d, short for "Groove Over Dose".

1999–2005: Success with g.o.d
After a lukewarm response to their debut performance in January 1999, the group went on the become one of the most popular K-pop groups in the 2000s. He gained attention for his unique rapping style and occasionally composed his own rap lyrics. The group later switched from SidusHQ to JYP Entertainment, with two members switching agencies while Ahn and Yoon renewed their individual contracts at SidusHQ.  In 2004, Yoon left the group and g.o.d continued as a quartet until December 2005.

2006–2013: Solo activities and projects
Ahn ventured into the radio industry prior to g.o.d going on hiatus in late December 2005. He became as a radio DJ on KBS Cool FM and was the first host of Kiss the Radio before taking over Lee Soo-young as host of the long-running afternoon program Music Show (ko). Due to his popularity as host of Music Show, he was invited back to be a guest DJ for the "Homecoming Day" special in 2015, in honor of KBS Cool FM's 50th anniversary.

Ahn released his solo single album on May 28, 2007 "If It Were A Dream", which featured a cappella group Sweet Sorrow. He has since largely done guest vocals for other artists such as Rain, his bandmate Kim Tae-woo, SG Wannabe and Kim Dong-wan of fellow first-generation group Shinhwa. Alongside his music career, Ahn also took roles in TV shows and films. In 2008, he appeared in Crazy Waiting, also known as The Longest 24 Months. He appeared as Baek-ho in the KBS drama, The Slave Hunters. He appeared in KBS Let's Go Dream Team! Season 2, and was the leader of the team. He also appeared as Manager Baek Nam-jung in The Fugitive: Plan B alongside Rain, Lee Jung-jin, Daniel Henney and Lee Na-young, and in The Innocent Man with Song Joong-ki and Moon Chae-won. He was a permanent guest on SBS's talk show Strong Heart.

Despite g.o.d going on hiatus, Ahn has reunited with his bandmates several times for collaborations. Ahn, Son Ho-young and Park Joon-hyung were featured in the song "Memories and Remembrance" (기억과추억), from Kim Tae-woo's mini album T-Virus. He also joined Kim and Son to perform their hit song "Lies" on the Music Bank special celebrating 600 episodes and at the 2012 Korean Music Festival in Los Angeles.

In May 2012, Ahn starred opposite Dave K. Wong as Gye Dong-hee, a friend to Ryu's Seung-hyuk in Channel A's Goodbye Dear Wife. He served as a commentator/host on We Got Married along with Lee Ji-hye, with hosts Park Mi-sun and Kim Jung-min before leaving the show on May 31, 2014. In 2013 he joined Top Gear Korea to host the fourth season.

Ahn was part of a project "group" called HOTSechgodRG, which comprises himself and four other members of first-generation idol groups who were born in the same year - 1978. The group was first conceived after former H.O.T member Moon Hee-joon invited Ahn, Tony An (H.O.T), Eun Ji-won (Sechs Kies) and Chun Myung-hoon (NRG) to create a reality show version of the television series Reply 1997 in which they would meet up at a rented house to chat and reflect on their heyday. The show was called Handsome Boys of the 20th Century (20세기 미소년) and also featured special guests, mainly their former bandmates and contemporaries. The group has also launched a music video and performed on Immortal Songs: Singing the Legend. The following year, in 2014, they starred in Where is My Superhero? on OnStyle. Due to busy schedules and the reuniting of g.o.d and Eun's group Sechs Kies, the group had not been able to meet up as often but remain close friends.

2014–present: g.o.d reunion and other activities
Ahn's contract with his previous agency SidusHQ expired, and he signed with Box Media in March 2014. He reunited with his g.o.d bandmates to prepare for their eighth album to celebrate the fifteen anniversary of their debut. He was personally involved in the composition of several songs, especially the rap. Following the release of the album in July, the group embarked on a nationwide concert tour.

Ahn starred in the SBS drama Witch's Castle, in which he portrayed the antagonist. His appearances on television are largely on variety shows such as Infinite Challenge, Fantastic Duo, King of Mask Singer and The Friends in Chiang Mai. He reunited with HOTSechgodRG members Chun Myung-hoon and Tony An on Eun Ji-won's new travel reality show Plan Man. The group, except Eun, most recently met up at Moon Hee-joon's bachelor party, part of which was shown on My Little Old Boy, the reality show Tony An was participating in.

In July 2018 Ahn re-signed with former agency SidusHQ. He had joined New Able Entertainment in 2016 but it was acquired by SidusHQ and he was one of several artists who opted to transfer to SidusHQ.

Since August 2020, Ahn and his g.o.d bandmate Son Ho-young have co-hosted a talk show g.o.d's Lunch Attack which airs on Naver's streaming app Naver NOW. at noon on weekdays.

In June 2022, Danny renewed his contract with Cuz-9 Entertainment.

Personal life
Ahn has revealed that he has had a total of five girlfriends in the past, with two of them being celebrities. Regarding his views on dating, Ahn has stated, "I won't publicly announce my relationship while I'm dating, but I'm going to confidently date her in public. But when I find someone that I really want to spend the rest of my life with, I'm going to make a public announcement."

He has one older sister.

Discography

Soundtrack contributions

As a featured artist

Lyrics and composition

Filmography

Television series

Film

Variety shows

Web shows

Music videos

Radio

Awards

References

External links
 
 
 

1978 births
Living people
G.o.d (South Korean band) members
American male actors of Korean descent
American male rappers
American musicians of Korean descent
American people of South Korean descent
American rappers of Asian descent
Dankook University alumni
IHQ (company) artists
JYP Entertainment artists
Musicians from Seattle
South Korean male film actors
South Korean male idols
South Korean male rappers
South Korean male television actors
South Korean pop singers
Rappers from Seoul
Male actors from Seoul
21st-century American rappers
American expatriates in South Korea
South Korean hip hop record producers